Despaxia augusta, known generally as the autumn needlefly or smooth needlefly, is a species of rolled-winged stonefly in the family Leuctridae. It is found in North America.

References

Plecoptera
Articles created by Qbugbot
Insects described in 1907